The 1997 NCAA Division I Field Hockey Championship was the 17th women's collegiate field hockey tournament organized by the National Collegiate Athletic Association, to determine the top college field hockey team in the United States. The North Carolina Tar Heels won their third championship, defeating the Old Dominion in the final The championship rounds were held at the George J. Sherman Family-Sports Complex in Storrs, Connecticut on the campus of the University of Connecticut.

Bracket

References 

1997
Field Hockey
1997 in women's field hockey
1997 in sports in Connecticut
Women's sports in Connecticut